Buster is a 1988 British romantic crime comedy-drama based on events from the Great Train Robbery, starring Phil Collins and Julie Walters.

The supporting cast include Larry Lamb and Shelia Hancock. The soundtrack features two singles from Collins which topped the Billboard Hot 100 chart.

Plot
Buster Edwards (Phil Collins) is a petty criminal from the East End of 1963 London. His long-suffering wife June (Julie Walters) thinks of him as a lovable rogue. The film opens with Buster walking along his local high street. He breaks into a shop to steal a suit, into which he then changes to attend a funeral. Buster brings Harry (Michael Attwell), who has been used on other 'jobs' and has recently served 18 months in prison for his part in previous robberies, to discuss the next 'job' with the ring-leader Bruce Reynolds (Larry Lamb). Harry wants 'in' and becomes part of the firm who are planning to rob a Royal Mail train allegedly carrying up to £1 million in cash.

After a complex and successful heist, the gang return to their farmhouse hideout to stay out of sight and split the spoils. They find they have stolen over £3 million − much more than they have anticipated or reported by the media. Members of the gang are shown drinking from beer bottles and glasses without wearing gloves, thereby leaving fingerprints which would be evidence of their involvement in the robbery. While lying low at the farmhouse, they hear on the radio that the police are searching farmhouses and outhouses within a  radius of the robbery site. The gang become nervous and some members want to immediately return to London for fear of discovery; others think they should keep to the original plan and stay put.

The gang decide to return to London, where they meet their 'contact', a solicitor's clerk who, as in the original plan, arranges for the farmhouse to be 'cleared and cleaned', thereby destroying any physical evidence linking the gang to the robbery. The contact states he will bring the plans forward from a few weeks to the next two to three days. Bruce, Buster and Harry are not happy with any delay at all because they fear imminent discovery, so they set off back to the farmhouse in their own car, to do the job themselves. During the journey, they hear on the car radio that the farmhouse hideout has been discovered, so they abandon their plans and return to London, hoping they will have time to escape with their families. Buster returns home, and is devastated to find that June has had a miscarriage while he was committing the robbery. She cannot believe it when she learns of his involvement in what has been quickly dubbed "The Great Train Robbery".

For several months after the robbery, Buster and June remain in hiding with their young daughter Nicky (Ellie Beaven) until they are turned in to the police by a suspicious neighbor. Buster flees to Acapulco, where he is met by fellow Great Train Robber, Bruce Reynolds, and his girlfriend Franny (Stephanie Lawrence), who are also on the run and living it up in the sun on the profits of the crime. June and Nicky arrive, despite the disapproval of her mother (Sheila Hancock), and although Nicky seems to love her new life in the sun, June is immediately unimpressed with their new way of life and resolves to return to England, despite knowing that if Buster is to return with them he will be imprisoned. Buster remains in Acapulco for some time after June leaves, until realizing (while celebrating England's 1966 World Cup triumph) that having money and the sun means nothing if he doesn't have his family, so he returns to England to accept his punishment.

Twelve years later in 1975, after his release from jail, Buster is seemingly content and running a flower stall near London's Waterloo Bridge.

Cast

Production
The opening sequence was filmed in Broadway Market, Hackney. The robbery scenes were filmed on the Great Central Railway, using British Rail Class 40, D306, as a stand-in for D326, the engine actually involved. Some scenes were filmed in Page Street, Westminster, London.

The real Buster Edwards plays a small cameo during the arrival in Acapulco. He is seen walking out of the airport (1hour/2 min into the film) with his girlfriend, played by Phil Collins’ wife, just before Buster, June, and Nicky.

Soundtrack
The soundtrack album includes three songs that were performed by Phil Collins. Two of them were released as singles, namely "A Groovy Kind of Love" and "Two Hearts", which reached #1 and #6 on the UK Singles Chart, respectively. Both songs were number one singles in the US.
Phil Collins also co-wrote "Loco in Acapulco", performed by the Four Tops for the soundtrack. "Two Hearts" received an Academy Award nomination for Best Original Song, a Grammy Award for Best Song Written Specifically for a Motion Picture or Television and a Golden Globe Award for Best Original Song, tying with "Let the River Run" from Working Girl by Carly Simon, while the soundtrack album received a Brit Award for Soundtrack/Cast Recording.

Release
Prince Charles and Princess Diana cancelled their attendance of the film's premiere on 15 September 1988, on the advice of Phil Collins, after the film was accused of glorifying crime. Collins said he wanted to avoid causing them "embarrassment". One of the film's critics was Conservative MP Ivor Stanbrook, who said the royal couple should not be associated with a film that "commemorates a particularly sordid and vicious crime."

The film opened 16 September 1988 at the Odeon Leicester Square in London and grossed £65,883 in its opening weekend, placing sixth at the UK box office despite playing in just one cinema. After expanding nationwide in its fifth week of release, it reached number one at the UK box office. The film went on to gross £3,939,329 ($7.2 million) in the UK, the highest-grossing independent film of the year; tenth highest-grossing film of the year and the third best British film behind A Fish Called Wanda and The Last Emperor. In the United States and Canada, it grossed $540,000 (£300,000).

Critical reception
Reviews for the film were mixed, with praise for the lead performances but criticism of the film's tone. Radio Times gave the film three stars out of five, stating: "Too squeaky clean to be believable, this is an entertaining but fairy-tale view of law-breaking." Roger Ebert of the Chicago Sun-Times gave it 3 out of 4 and wrote: "Buster is played with surprising effectiveness by rock star Phil Collins, who looks and sounds like a gentler Bob Hoskins." Halliwell's Film Guide described the film as an "uneasy combination of romantic comedy and chase thriller". Leonard Maltin gave the film two-and-a-half stars, writing: "Singer Collins' starring film debut is a diverting (if forgettable) yarn, with Walters a good match as his loving, long-suffering spouse." Maltin also wrote that the film had a "great soundtrack".

Stage version
A stage production of Buster was staged between 2000 and 2004 at various locations across the UK starring (amongst others) Ray Quinn in the main cast. The production was an adaptation by Kieran Woodbury of the original Colin Shindler screenplay.

References

External links
 
 
 

1980s biographical films
1980s crime comedy films
British biographical films
British crime comedy films
British films based on actual events
Films about train robbery
Films set on farms
Films set in Buckinghamshire
Films set in London
Films set in Mexico
Films set in the 1960s
Great Train Robbery (1963)
Metro-Goldwyn-Mayer films
Crime films based on actual events
Films scored by Anne Dudley
1988 comedy films
1988 films
Romantic crime films
1980s English-language films
1980s British films